Brooke may refer to:

People 
 Brooke (given name)
 Brooke (surname)
 Brooke baronets, families of baronets with the surname Brooke

Places 
 Brooke, Norfolk, England
 Brooke, Rutland, England
 Brooke, Virginia, US
 Brooke's Point, Palawan, Philippines
 Fort Brooke, US

Other
 Brooke Army Medical Center, Fort Sam Houston, Texas, US
 Brooke (VRE station)
 Brooke Bond, a tea company
 Brooke rifle, an American Civil War coast defense gun

See also
 Brookes
 Justice Brooke (disambiguation)